The Babusar bus accident was the deadliest road accident in Gilgit-Baltistan history.

Incident
On 22 September 2019, a bus carrying approximately 60 people. met with an accident after the brakes failed and slammed into the mountain while making a sharp turn. The accident killed at least 26 people and another 12 were wounded.

Rescue operation
In a rescue operation carried out by the Pakistan Army, the injured were shifted to Combined Military Hospital (CMH), Gilgit by armed forces' aviation helicopters, the military's media wing said in a statement. The bodies of the dead were also taken to CMH, Gilgit, the statement added.

Ashfaq said that Rescue 1122 and police teams had been dispatched to the site of the accident. Additionally, he said that a helicopter has been requested from the government of Gilgit-Baltistan (GB) in order to transport the bodies to Skardu following identification. Two helicopters are expected to reach shortly.

Meanwhile, GB government spokesperson Firaq said that the injured were being shifted to Gilgit in a helicopter. He expressed his gratitude with the force commander for providing a Pakistan Army helicopter for the mission, adding that an ambulance of the Army was also taking part in the rescue operation.

References

Road incident deaths in Pakistan
Bus incidents in Pakistan